Priuli is a surname. Notable people with the surname include:

 Giovanni Priuli ( 1575–1626), Italian composer and organist
 Girolamo Priuli (1476–1547), Venetian noble
 Girolamo Priuli (1486–1567), Venetian noble
 Lorenzo Priuli (1489–1559), Doge of Venice

Italian-language surnames